Bryan Adams is the debut solo studio album by Canadian singer-songwriter Bryan Adams, after previously being the lead vocalist of Canadian hard rock band Sweeney Todd, released on 12 February 1980 by A&M Records. "Hidin' From Love" reached number 64 and "Give Me Your Love" reached number 91 on Canada's RPM 100 Singles chart.

Production and release 
In early 1978, Bryan Adams teamed up with Jim Vallance (formerly of Canadian band Prism) to form a song-writing duo. A&M Records signed the pair as songwriters, not long before signing Adams as a recording artist. He worked on his self-titled debut album for the balance of 1979 with it being released on 12 February 1980.

The first single was "Hidin' from Love" in 1980, peaked at number 43 on the Billboard dance charts, which was followed up by "Give Me Your Love" and "Remember". Although the album never received any US notoriety on its debut, it was the door opener that led to getting radio play, tours, management, agents and the music business in general, interested in the 20-year-old songwriter.

The first tour was across Canada playing clubs and colleges. It was during this time that Adams developed the songs for the US breakthrough album You Want It You Got It (1981).

Track listing

Personnel 
 Bryan Adams – vocals, acoustic piano, guitars 
 Peter Bjerring – keyboards, guitars, backing vocals 
 Marek Norman – keyboards, backing vocals 
 Jim Vallance – keyboards, guitars, bass, drums 
 Jeff Baxter – guitars
 Jim Clench – bass, backing vocals 
 David Hungate – bass
 Tom Szczesniak – bass
 Fred Turner – bass 
 Dick Smith – drums, percussion 
 Gene Meros – saxophones
 Colina Phillips – backing vocals 
 Sharon Lee Williams – backing vocals

Production 
 Bryan Adams – producer 
 Jim Vallance – producer 
 Hayward Parrott – recording 
 Alan Perkins – additional recording
 Geoff Turner – additional recording 
 Joe Laux – recording assistant 
 Paul MacDonald – recording assistant 
 Gene Meros – recording assistant 
 Dave Taylor – recording assistant 
 Bob Schaper – mixing 
 Mike Reese – mastering 
 Sunset Sound (Hollywood, California) – mixing location 
 The Mastering Lab (Hollywood, California) – mastering location 
 Chuck Beeson – art direction, design 
 Mark Hanauer – photography 
 Bruce Allen – management

Charts

Notable cover songs 
 In 1982, "Hidin' From Love" and "Remember" were covered by the British group Rosetta Stone. Their version of "Hidin' From Love" reached No. 46 on Canada's RPM 100 Singles chart.

References 
 MTV Biography

External links 
 Biography of Bryan Adams

Bryan Adams albums
1980 debut albums
A&M Records albums